James Edward de Visme (1791 – 12 November 1859) was an English first-class cricketer associated with Marylebone Cricket Club who was active in the 1820s. He is recorded in one match in 1825, totalling 2 runs with a highest score of 1.

References

English cricketers
English cricketers of 1787 to 1825
Gentlemen cricketers
1791 births
1859 deaths